Penang Hill is a hill resort comprising a group of peaks near the center of Penang Island, Malaysia. Penang Hill is also known by the Malay name Bukit Bendera, which actually refers to Flagstaff Hill, the most developed peak. One of the peaks is known as Strawberry Hill, which was also the name of a house owned by Francis Light, founder of Penang colony.  

A number of hills are covered by Penang Hill, with the highest point being Western Hill that stands at an altitude of 833 meters (2,733 feet) above sea level. Penang Hill is a hilly and forested area that stands out from the lowlands of Malaysia by being hilly and wooded. The area was used as a retreat during the British colonial period, and is now a very popular tourist destination due to its history and heritage.

The top of Flagstaff Hill, the most developed tourist area, is accessible via the Penang Hill Railway from its base station at Hill Railway Station Road. To date, this funicular railway system is the only one of its kind in Malaysia, transporting over a million visitors to the top of Penang Hill .

Penang Hill is part of Penang Hill Biosphere Reserve, recognized by UNESCO as the third Biosphere Reserve in Malaysia listed in the World Network of Biosphere Reserves (WNBR).

History

Captain Francis Light, founder of the colony in Penang, first plotted a horse track from the Penang Botanic Gardens waterfall up to the top of the hill in 1788. He cleared an area in order to grow strawberries, and it therefore became known as Strawberry Hill.

The official name of Penang Hill however was Flagstaff Hill, which is still reflected in its name in Malay, Bukit Bendera (literally "Flag Hill"). The name was a reference to the flagstaff outside "Bel Retiro", which was the residence of the Governor of Penang built by Francis Light c. 1789. The area is, however, widely known as Penang Hill which is, in fact, a collective term covering a number of hills, and the other names such as Flagstaff Hill and Strawberry Hill are still used for specific peaks in the area. The hill became a cool retreat for the British colonists from the heat of the lowlands and threat of malaria, and many bungalows were built on the summit of Penang Hill for government servants and army officials. A convalescent bungalow was built in 1803.

One of the earliest buildings on Strawberry Hill was a house built by David Brown on land given by Francis Light. Australian historian Marcus Langdon, however, believes Strawberry Hill house was built by William Edward Phillips, who was also the owner of Suffolk House, and not David Brown. The house however burnt down and it was rebuilt in the 19th century, and it was being used as a restaurant as of 2012. The post office was first opened in 1894, and a hotel, the Crag Hotel, owned by the Sarkies Brothers, was established in 1895 and sold in the 1920s; operational until it was closed in World War II. The building became a boarding school The International School of Penang (Uplands) from 1955 till 1977. The first police station was built in 1929, and the building is still standing here on the same site.

In the early days the only way to the top of hill was to travel on foot or horseback, or be carried on a dooly (sedan chair). The first attempt at a mountain railway on Penang Hill began in 1897 but it proved unsuccessful; it was built between 1901 and 1905 but had technical faults. The Straits government then organised a new project to construct the Penang Hill Funicular Railway at a cost of 1.5 million Straits dollars. The railway was first opened to the public on 21 October 1923 and officially opened on 1 January 1924. The funicular railway led to a sharp increase in residential development as it became a location for the building of holiday villas and bungalows by Europeans and wealthy local Chinese towkays alike. It also led to its development into a major tourist destination in Penang. It received well over a million visitors a year by 2012.

A major revamp at Penang Hill was initiated in 2010. The railway was overhauled, allowing for faster access to the hill, and facilities for visitors, walkways and viewing decks were constructed.

Geography

Topography
Penang Hill is mainly a hilly granitic mass. Other than Western Hill, there are a number of peaks in the region, such as Bukit Laksamana (Malay for Admiral Hill), Tiger Hill, Flagstaff Hill, Haliburton's Hill, Fern Hill, Strawberry Hill, and Government Hill. A number of small rivers and streams originate from the region. Sungai Pinang (Malay for Penang River) is the largest of the rivers, and it starts from a number of tributaries in the area.

Land use
Because Penang Hill has a cooler environment, it has been a popular holiday retreat. A number of bungalows were built around Flagstaff Hill. The northern part of the Hills are not well developed. Government Hill, Bukit Timah (Malay for Tin Hill) and others are designated water catchment areas and no development is permitted.

Some recreational potential exists at the upper reaches of the river where the water is relatively clean. In a number of cases, sudden changes in ground level have resulted in a series of small waterfalls and rapids, where bathing, dipping and picnicking are popular.

The lower terrain of the Hills is used mainly for agricultural and residential purposes.

Accessibility

The most convenient way up to Penang Hill is by means of the Penang Hill Railway, a funicular railway from Air Itam to the top of Flagstaff Hill. The  journey used to take about half an hour and the train may stop at intermediate stations upon request. However, upgrades to the system now allows non-stop rides to the top in five to ten minutes.

For Malaysians, the fare for a return (round-trip) ticket is RM12 per adult and RM6 per child aged between three and 12. For foreign tourists, the return fare would be RM30 for adults and RM15 for children aged seven to 12. Senior citizens and students will enjoy cheaper fares at RM6 per person. The ride continues to remain free of charge for disabled persons holding the OKU (Malay acronym for Orang Kurang Upaya) card. Penang Hill residents, licensed traders and hawkers and workers can purchase a monthly season pass at RM28. The blue, air-conditioned Swiss-made coaches, capable of ferrying up to 100 passengers at one go, run from 6:30am to 11pm daily. The ticketing counter opens at 6:30am and will be closed at 10:30pm daily.

Alternatively, there is a  tarred road known popularly as the "jeep track". It is open only to the vehicles of hill residents. The "jeep track" is also used by off-road motorcycle enthusiasts to traverse up the steep terrain. It is a popular hiking route. It begins at the quarry at the entrance of the Penang Botanic Gardens and it takes a two- or three-hour leisurely hike to reach the top. Some of the more famous pit stops at the mountain are 52 and 84. At these pit stops, a view of the island is visible to hikers, who are able to get some water and tea prepared by locals stationed on the hill. Eighty Four is the last pit stop before the top of Penang Hill—approximately forty-five more minutes from 84.

Jalan Sultan Yahya Petra, more commonly known as Summit Road, leads from the top station to the western part of the hill right towards Western Hill and Tiger Hill.

The eastern face of Penang Hill is well served by a series of roads and paths, for example, Moniot Road, Viaduct Road, and Tunnel Road. Moniot Road is named after a Frenchman, Michael Jules Moniot who surveyed it between 1846 and 1855. Moniot Road has been declared a Heritage Trail in 1995 by the Governor of Penang.

A system of bridle paths forms a picturesque labyrinth of walks connecting the different bungalows. Indian penal servitude prisoners shipped from Bencoolen, Sumatra to Penang during the second half of the 19th century built these by-paths.

Numerous trekking trails lead from various starting points in the lowlands to Penang Hill. The more popular trails include the Moongate Trail, trail from Air Itam Dam to Tiger Hill, trail from Hye Keat Estate and trail from the Municipal Park (formerly Youth Park). Some of the trails are used by farmers to transport produce to the markets of Balik Pulau and Air Itam.

Climate

The most important feature of Penang Hill is the cooler climate. The core summit area has an average temperature ranging from 20° to 27 °C. The mean minimum temperature is consistently below 21 °C. The hottest months are between December and April while the coolest months are between June and October. It is generally 5 degrees cooler than Georgetown.

Plant and animal life

Flora
The most common forest type found on Penang Hill is the hill dipterocarp forest. Growing at higher altitudes are some of the submontane oak-laurel as well as coniferous trees. The tree fern which is normally associated with higher elevations is also found growing here.

Penang Hill is scientifically important as a type site of many Malaysian plant species. In the past, botanists came here to collect plants for herbaria around the world. It is an area rich in biodiversity and has a great number of endemic species, some of which are so rare that their existence is endangered.

The rare and endangered species include the parasitic plant Exorhopalia ruficeps, which grows in the shady and damp undergrowth. The Penang Slipper Orchid (Paphiopedilum barbatum) is fast becoming over-collected and disappearing. The endangered witch hazel Maingaya malayana was rediscovered years ago and has since been propagated.

Fauna
Large mammals are not found on Penang Hill. Wild boars, small and medium-sized mammals such as the squirrels, monkeys and tree shrews can be seen. A number of species found in these hills are nocturnal. These include the civets, flying lemurs, flying civets and bats.

In the evenings, the characteristic calls of the cicadas and crickets are often heard. If one is discerning enough, the stick insect and leaf mantis may be found well-camouflaged among the vegetation.

Penang Hill has a rich bird fauna. Over 100 species or about 80% of the birds found on Penang Island have been recorded here. They range from the common garden species to rare deep forest inhabitants.

Attractions

Penang Hill Gallery@Edgecliff 
Edgecliff Bungalow (originally Braeside) enjoys an astounding view of Penang’s east coast. Although designed by the Scottish architect J.C. Miller as a private bungalow, the Penang Government acquired it only two years later. Overlooking the Penang strait from the port to the north down to the airfield to the south, its strategic importance was too obvious to be ignored. In 2019, Penang Hill Corporation and the Penang State Government initiated the idea of preserving and conserving Edgecliff Bungalow; restoring it into the first information and education centre on Penang Hill for travellers, visitors, world explorers, researchers, scientists, academicians and the intellectually curious.

Today, Penang Hill Gallery@Edgecliff stands majestically watching over the UNESCO World Heritage Site of George Town. Divided into 5 gallery exhibits (Funicular Train, Time Tunnel, Biodiversity, Heritage, Cultural), Penang Hill Gallery@Edgecliff tells meaningful stories of Penang’s highest point from the lenses of those who have lived through its rich history, heritage and time.
More info at

The Habitat Penang Hill 
The Habitat Penang Hill offers the most complete and educational Malaysian rainforest experience and is located less than 10 km from the UNESCO World Heritage Site of George Town in Penang. Explore their 1.6 km Nature Trail which is steeped in history as it was first built in the early 1800s by the British East India Company on the edge of a forest reserve protected since 1911. Take in the sights and sounds of the rainforest from Langur Way Canopy Walk 40m off the forest floor. Revel in the 360-degree views of Penang Island and the mainland from Curtis Crest Treetop Walk that allows you to see just how important Penang’s forests are to the health and well-being of urban Penang both as a source of water as well as a green lung. Finally, experience the rainforest from the air with the Flight of the Colugo zip line course which allows visitors to see the rainforest canopy from the perspective of one of Malaysia's most iconic mammal species, the Sunda Colugo and the thousands of other forest species that live in the tree-tops. Visitors will find themselves immersed in the natural beauty of the rainforest, marveling at the beautiful flora and fauna that inhabit this natural sanctuary including species such as the Dusky Leaf Langur monkey, Racquet-tailed Drongo bird, the flying Draco lizard, numerous species of wild butterflies and other ancient rainforest giants such as the Damar Minyak (Agethis borneensis) and Rhu Bukit (Dacrydium elatum) conifer trees. In short, The Habitat Penang Hill is a nature experience not to be missed when visiting Penang.

Funds generated by The Habitat Penang Hill are channelled towards urgent efforts to conserve biodiversity and safeguard nature through The Habitat Foundation. Our programme of work includes initiatives in education, research, conservation and sustainable tourism. Your visit today is helping to make a difference.

Love lock 
It was launched on Valentine's Day of 2014, and visitors may purchase padlocks, decorate them individually and have them secured along the fence.

Viewing deck 
At the apex of the hill near to the train station the focus is on enhancing visitors' experience, maximising the views and resolving space needs. Both soft and hard landscaping have been used to augment the hilltop forest experience. The holding area has been expanded for shade and shelter while large viewing decks and pathways with planting have been fashioned into the slopes. Three viewing decks with gardens at varying heights provide views, while two additional platforms at the lower level allow rest under forest shading. The Skyway is planned to allow 360-degree views while also fulfilling accessibility needs.

References

Sources
 )
 Malaysian Nature Society, Penang Development Corporation (PDC) et al. Penang Hill – A Part of Our Heritage brochure

External links

Penang Hill Corporation Official Website

Landforms of Penang
Hill stations in Malaysia
Hills of Malaysia
Tourist attractions in Penang